Scaeosopha minuta is a species of moth of the family Cosmopterigidae. It is found on Borneo and Sulawesi.

The wingspan is 8.5–10 mm. The forewings are whitish yellow, overlaid with black and brown spots, stripes and patches. The hindwings are deep-grey.

Etymology
The species name refers to the small size of the species and is derived from Latin minutus (meaning small).

References

Moths described in 2012
Scaeosophinae